Love & Disrespect is the debut album of New Zealand band, Elemeno P. It was released 4 July 2003 through Universal Records. Love & Disrespect debuted at #1 on the New Zealand Album charts.

The first single "Fast Times in Tahoe", peaked at #32 in the New Zealand Singles chart, and "Urban Getaway" reached #27.

"On My Balcony" is also known as "Fight For You".

Track listing

Original release

Charts

Weekly charts

Year-end charts

Certifications

References

2003 debut albums
Elemeno P albums